Hong Kong–Shenzhen Western Express Railway is a proposed cross-border railway offering three future distinct services, Hong Kong International Airport – Shenzhen Bao'an International Airport direct connection, Hung Shui Kiu–Qianhai cross border services and domestic service between Tuen Mun and Siu Ho Wan.

History
In a 2000 Hong Kong governmental study, two separate rail links were proposed as the Deep Bay Link and the Chek Lap Kok Link. It was envisaged that the Deep Bay Link could connect the Nanshan District of Shenzhen with the new developing areas in Hung Shui Kiu, possibly interchanging with the MTR Tuen Ma Line. The Chek Lap Kok Link would connect HKIA and Lantau Island with Tuen Mun. However it was determined that the projects were not warranted at the development levels of the served areas at that time.

A further study put forward a proposed Airport Rail Link to connect Hong Kong International Airport and Shenzhen Bao'an International Airport. This would be in addition to the current fast ferry service between the two airports, allowing seamless transfers between domestic Chinese flights from Shenzhen and international flight from Hong Kong, allowing travellers to bypass Hong Kong Immigration.

In another 2011 Hong Kong governmental rail study, the above projects were combined and renamed the Hong Kong–Shenzhen Western Express Railway. In the decade since the original study, the residential development areas in the North Western New Territories had outpaced the infrastructure developments in that region. Also the two existing and third under construction cross border rail lines all went to the eastern districts of Futian and Luohu, Shenzhen. With major new Shenzhen developments occurring in the western Nanshan district, especially the new Qianhai CBD area, it was deemed that a western rail crossing was feasible. It would also utilise the new Hong Kong Cross Border Facility (HKBCF) being built on reclaimed land near the airport, built to service the Hong Kong–Zhuhai–Macau Bridge.

Air rail intermodal service
The aviation network covered by the two airports can be complementary, where the HKIA operates flights to around 120 overseas destinations and the SZIA has flights to around 110 domestic destinations. Through a fast rail connection between the two airports, it would create opportunities for the airline companies on both sides to jointly provide air-transit service between international and mainland cities. Air passengers arriving at the HKIA by international flights from overseas cities could then take the railway to the SZIA and transfer to a connecting domestic flight to destinations on the mainland, including second-tier and third-tier mainland cities, 
and vice versa.

Due to the proximity of the two airports, the railway journey time would only take around twenty or so minutes and shorten the minimum connection time (MCT) between the flights. The target is to make the MCT comparable with those between international and domestic flights at other major airports on the Mainland. As the HKIA has certain competitive advantages in terms of the number of international destinations and flight frequencies, second-tier and third-tier mainland cities lacking in direct international air services would find the air-transit service at the HKIA and SZIA more convenient than that of other mainland airports, making the airports of Hong Kong and Shenzhen more competitive.

In addition, the provision of cross-boundary land-to-air services (i.e. travelling from the urban area of Shenzhen to the HKIA, or from the urban area of Hong Kong to the SZIA) can facilitate Hong Kong passengers to reach second-tier and third-tier mainland cities through the SZIA, and attract residents in Shenzhen and the eastern coast of the Pearl River Delta to travel to overseas destinations through the HKIA, thereby expanding the market catchment of the two airports.

Cross-boundary spur line service
Since its commissioning in 2007, the Hong Kong-Shenzhen Western Corridor has been the only cross-boundary land route connecting to western Shenzhen. Its patronage has increased on average by 26% per annum from 2008 to 2011, and is much higher than the 6% average annual growth for the overall land-based cross-boundary trips in the 2000s. This reflects a strong public demand for cross-boundary transport services to the western Shenzhen.

Meanwhile, Qianhai is the key development area in the western Shenzhen and has been targeted to develop as a production service centre and a Hong Kong-Shenzhen modern service industries co-operation exemplary zone. It is expected to stimulate extensive economic activities and generate new cross-boundary transport demand. Furthermore, Qianhai will become a transport hub of the Shenzhen metro-lines (including the Shenzhen Metro No. 1, 5 and 11 Lines), and the future extension of the Guangzhou-Dongguan-Shenzhen Intercity Railway to this area, allowing passengers to travel conveniently to and from ten or so major towns on the eastern coast of the PRD.

By comparison, there are over 100 existing operators at present providing cross-boundary coach services via the Shenzhen Bay Port. There are also franchised buses and minibuses running from Tuen Mun, Tin Shui Wai and Yuen Long to the Shenzhen Bay Port, largely performing the same function of the proposed Cross-boundary Spur Line. Therefore, the implementation programme for the Cross-boundary Spur Line Service will depend on the growth of the cross-boundary movements, planning parameters and actual implementation progress of the Hung Shui Kiu and Qianhai developments.

Domestic spur line service
The idea of the Domestic Spur Line Service is to conveniently serve the daily transport demand of the residents in Tuen Mun and Yuen Long travelling to the HKIA and northern Lantau, or interchanging with the Tung Chung line to travel to and from Kowloon and Hong Kong Island. Subject to the planning conditions, the Domestic Spur Line can also serve Siu Ho Wan if development takes place in that region. Furthermore, the Domestic Spur Line Service could connect the Hong Kong Border Crossing Facility(HKBCF) to the local railway network, allowing cross-boundary passengers to travel to the North West New Territories (NWNT) via the West Rail line or urban area via the Tung Chung line to connect with the Hong Kong–Zhuai–Macau Bridge.

On the other hand, the proposed Tuen Mun–Chek Lap Kok Link (TMCLKL) will connect the NWNT, HKBCF and northern Lantau and become an alternative land route to the northern Lantau and HKIA. This road link will support both passenger and cargo transportation services, and reduce the risk of completely relying on the Lantau Link as the sole corridor to the HKIA; however, the proposed TMCLKL would partly overlap with the route of the Domestic Spur Line.

References

Regional rail in Hong Kong
Proposed railway lines in Hong Kong